Constantin Kirițescu (September 3, 1876 – August 12, 1965) was a Romanian zoologist, educator and historian. Born and schooled in Bucharest, he occupied successive posts in the Education Ministry, with education being a running theme of his diverse interests. He was among the founders of the Romanian Academy of Sciences.

Kirițescu was a teacher at Saint Sava High School. 
His name is most associated with Istoria războiului pentru reîntregirea României ("The History of the War That United Romania"), a 1922 account of the part played by Romania in World War I.

Publications

Notes

1876 births
1965 deaths
Scientists from Bucharest
Romanian zoologists
Romanian educational theorists
20th-century Romanian historians
Historians of World War I
Members of the Romanian Academy of Sciences
Writers from Bucharest
Romanian military historians